Jacobus Johannes (Joop) Klant (1 March 1915 in Warmenhuizen – 26 December 1994 in Amsterdam), was a Dutch economist, novelist and professor of political economy at the University of Amsterdam.

Biography 
His parents were Pieter Klant en Geertje de Moor. He studied economics at the University of Amsterdam. In the late 1930s he broke off his studies to succeed his deceased father, who had been paymaster of the vegetable auction in Warmenhuizen. Later in 1954 he completed his studies in economics. Again twenty years later in 1973, he published his PhD thesis entitled "Spelregels voor Economen" ("Rules for Economists"). This methodological treatise attracted much attention and was honored in 1978 with Kluwer Price.

After studying economics in Amsterdam, Klant worked as statistician at the National Office for Construction Material in Amsterdam. Just after the Second World War Klant left for South Africa, where he worked as statistician for eight years in Pretoria. Back in the Netherlands, he worked at the research centre of the Nederlandse Handelsmaatschappij, later ABN.

In 1966 he became a lecturer and since 1975, he has been a professor of political economy at the University of Amsterdam. Klant was one of the founding members of the department for "History and Methodology of Economic Science", now the "History & Methodology of Economics" (HME) group. From 1966 until 1975 Klant was director of SEO Economic Research as successor of Jacobus Franciscus Haccoû.

In 1947 Klant was awarded the Lucy B. en C.W. van der Hoogtprijs by the Maatschappij der Nederlandse Letterkunde for his novel De geboorte van Jan Klaassen from 1946. Further in his life Klant always kept in though with the humanities: as chairman of the Fonds van de Letteren, and as of De Bezige Bij publishing company.

In 1993 he received the Akademiepenning of the Royal Netherlands Academy of Arts and Sciences, together with Arie Pais. In the same year, he and Theodore Aloysius Stevers were also awarded the Pierson Penning.

His sister Sabeth Klant was prominent advocate in the second wave of feminism. She was among other thing treasurer for the Wij vrouwen eisen. In Pretoria on 24 January 1948 Joop Klant married Anna Joana (Jacqueline) Faljan Vlielander Hein (born 1911). She was member of the Hein family, daughter of Benjamin Marius Faijan Vlielander Hein (1887–1959) and Anna Josenhans (1889–1961).

Publications 
 1946: De geboorte van Jan Klaassen
 1954: De fiets (3rd ed. 1979)
 1956: Hollands Diep
 1973: Wandeling door Walein
 1973: Spelregels voor economen; de logische structuur van economische theorieën (2e druk 1979) 
 1975: Wat is economie? Inaugural speech,
 1977: Geld en banken 
 1979: Samenleving en onderzoek. Joop Klant, Wim Driehuis, Herman J. Bierens en Anton Julius Butter (red.) 
 1980: Balansreeksen 1900-1975 van financiële instellingen in Nederland
 1987: Filosofie van de Economische Wetenschappen
 1988: Geld, Banken en Financiële Markten (met Casper van Ewijk) ook: 1990, 1992
 1988: Het ontstaan van de staathuishoudkunde

Articles, a selection
 1990: "Refutability" In: Methodus December 1990. p. 6-9

 About Klant
 Een lezenswaardig interview uit 1978 met J. J. Klant in: Arnold Heertje & Ria Kuip - Dat bonte economenvolk (1979)

References

External links 
 Jan J. Klant in the Digital Library of Dutch Literature (dbnl)
 J.J. Klant list archive at the Netherlands Economic History Archive (NEHA).

1915 births
1994 deaths
Dutch male novelists
University of Amsterdam alumni
Academic staff of the University of Amsterdam
People from Harenkarspel
20th-century Dutch novelists
20th-century Dutch male writers
20th-century Dutch economists